Tell Taalabaya is an archaeological site 2.5 km southwest of the bridge at Maalaka in the Beqaa Mohafazat (Governorate) in Lebanon. It dates at least to the Neolithic.

References

Baalbek District
Neolithic settlements
Bronze Age sites in Lebanon